Verkh-Cherga (Ĵaan Çargı) is a rural locality (a selo) in Shebalinsky District, the Altai Republic, Russia. The population was 211 as of 2016. There are 4 streets.

Geography 
Verkh-Cherga is located 27 km northwest of Shebalino (the district's administrative centre) by road. Malaya Cherga is the nearest rural locality.

References 

Rural localities in Shebalinsky District